Welcome 2 Ibiza is a 2002 American action comedy film directed by David Winters and starring Mariano Alameda, Mackenzie Astin, Gary Busey, and Athena Cansino. The screenplay concerns a young American girl who inherits a rundown bar and then gets involved in a hostage rescue drama. The film was shot on location on the Spanish island of Ibiza.  The film was released in Spain and Thailand.

Plot
Lauren (Athena Cansino), a young woman from America, learns that her Uncle Sam (director David Winters) has been missing at sea, and that as a result she inherits his beach bar on the Mediterranean island of Ibiza. When she arrives, she meets Angelito, a young handsome artist. They go to the bar, only to find it in terrible shape.

Depressed, Lauren returns to town where she meets two more Americans, (Beth and Marilyn) and Crazy Larry. Beth was currently working in a bar, and Marilyn, is a passionate young dancer who was fired after an altercation with a group of drunk buffoons. Crazy Larry, a wacky British DJ was also recently fired for accidentally throwing up on his boss.

Together, the four decide to renovate the bar and get the business running again. Meanwhile, Beth's ex, Nick, has come from the United States to try to get back together with her. They later discover that Angelito's father is being held captive by Cortez, a local gangster (Busey).

Behind the scenes
The island of Ibiza had an casting call for extras in the film. This was shot after the tourist season, so casting was entirely locals and expatriates.

Cast

Release dates
Welcome 2 Ibiza was released in Spain and in Thailand in 2003.

Awards
Audience Award - Best Picture 2002 Bangkok International Film Festival

See also
 Ibiza island

References

External links
 

2003 films
Action International Pictures films
Films set in Ibiza
2000s English-language films
American action comedy films
Films directed by David Winters
2000s American films